Elk Lake Airport  is adjacent to Elk Lake, Ontario, Canada.

See also
Elk Lake Water Aerodrome

References

Registered aerodromes in Timiskaming District